Variibacter  is a genus of bacteria from the family Nitrobacteraceae with one known species (Variibacter gotjawalensis).

References

Nitrobacteraceae
Bacteria genera
Monotypic bacteria genera